Wednesday Music Playlist is a South Korea variety show program on tvN. It aired on tvN on Wednesdays at 23:00 (KST) from 2 October to 4 December 2019.

Synopsis 
This show is led by PD . The show feature the 4 cast members enjoying many forgotten and hidden masterpieces and unknown new songs through various entertainment formats such as talks, games and outdoor variety.

Cast 
 Jun Hyun-moo
 Kim Jun-ho
 John Park
 Kim Jae-hwan

Episodes

2019

Ratings 
 Ratings listed below are the individual corner ratings of Wednesday Music Playlist. (Note: Individual corner ratings do not include commercial time, which regular ratings include.)

Notes

References

External links 
 Official website 

South Korean variety television shows
2019 South Korean television series debuts
2019 South Korean television series endings
Korean-language television shows